Alligator Farm is the third solo studio album by Paul Gilbert formerly of the heavy metal band Racer X and the hard rock band Mr. Big. It was released in 2000.

Track listing
All songs written by Paul Gilbert except where noted:

Notes
Track 6 originally recorded by the Spice Girls.
Track 14 arranged by Paul Gilbert.

Musicians
 Paul Gilbert – Guitar, Vocals
 Tony Spinner – Guitar, Vocals
 Scotty Johnson – Guitar, Organ, Piano
 Mike Szuter – Bass, Vocals
 Jeff Martin – drums, percussion, Vocals
 Jimi Kidd – Guest guitar (Track 13)
 Jeff Scott Soto – Shouts (Track 3)
 Kate Gilbert – Shouts (Track 7)
 Julian Quayle – Voices (Track 9)

Production
 Tom King-Size - Engineering, Mixing
 Steve Hall - Mastering
 Denny Thomas - Engineer
 Dan McCabe - Assistant Engineer
 William Hames - Photography
 Harry Freemantle - Art Direction
 David Frangioni - Mixing

References

External links
 Alligator Farm at Discogs
 Heavy Harmonies page

Paul Gilbert albums
2000 albums
Shrapnel Records albums
Albums produced by Richard Stannard (songwriter)